The Western District Lakes of Victoria, in the Western District of Victoria, south-eastern Australia, were recognised on 15 December 1982 as wetlands of international importance by listing under the Ramsar Convention, as Ramsar site no.268.

Description
They include State Wildlife Reserves and Lake Reserves and serve as drought refuges for tens of thousands of waterbirds. Several threatened plants occur within the site, including the endangered Lepidium ashersonii. The lakes are used for various purposes, including recreational fishing and duck hunting as well as grazing, commercial fishing, and wastewater disposal. Lakes included in the site are:

 Lake Beeac; hypersaline; 
 Lake Bookar; 
 Lake Colongulac; saline; 
 Lake Corangamite; hypersaline; 
 Lake Cundare; hypersaline; 
 Lake Gnarpurt; saline; 
 Lake Milangil; saline; 
 Lake Murdeduke; saline; 
 Lake Terangpom; fresh;

Birds
The Ramsar-listed lakes, along with other nearby lakes have been identified by BirdLife International as a  Important Bird Area (IBA) because they support over 1% of the world populations of Australian shelducks, chestnut teals and banded stilts and irregularly support over 1% of the world populations of freckled ducks, musk ducks, blue-billed ducks, black swans, Australasian shovellers, pink-eared ducks, hoary-headed grebes, straw-necked ibises, sharp-tailed sandpipers and white-headed stilts.

The additional lakes in the IBA are:
 Cundare Pool / Lake Martin; ; saline
 Lough Calvert (including Upper, Middle and Lower Lough Calvert)
 Lake Thurrumbong

Other birds for which the lakes occasionally support high numbers include double-banded plovers, red-necked avocets, Eurasian coots, great crested grebes, Australian pelicans, great cormorants, little pied cormorants, grey teals, whiskered terns, hardheads and red-necked stints.

See also

 List of lakes of Victoria

References

Lakes of Victoria (Australia)
Ramsar sites in Australia
Important Bird Areas of Victoria (Australia)
Western District (Victoria)